Roman Vonášek (born 8 July 1968) is a Czech former football player.

Club career
During his junior years he played for Sokol Bělčice, TJ Blatná, Spartak Písek, RH České Budějovice and RH Cheb.

He joined KSC Lokeren from Sparta Prague in summer 1996 and spent there six and a half years before leaving for Brugge at the age of 34. In 2007, he joined FC Viktoria Plzeň in a non-playing capacity.

International career

Stats

References

External links
 Profile & stats - Lokeren
 

1968 births
Living people
Czech footballers
Czech Republic international footballers
Czech expatriate footballers
FC Viktoria Plzeň players
AC Sparta Prague players
Cercle Brugge K.S.V. players
K.S.C. Lokeren Oost-Vlaanderen players
K.V. Mechelen players
Czech First League players
Belgian Pro League players
Expatriate footballers in Belgium
Association football midfielders
People from Strakonice
Sportspeople from the South Bohemian Region